Frederick "Fred" Elder is a former NASCAR Winston Cup Series race car owner whose primary manufacturer was Dodge.

Career
His career spanned from 1968 to 1976; employing legendary NASCAR driver Ray Elder through 26 races of his career.

Fred has guided his son Ray to two Cup Series wins, nine finishes in the "top five," 15 finishes in the "top ten," and 121 laps led out of 3247 laps competed. Elder has earned a grand total of $96,425 during his career as a NASCAR Cup Series vehicle owner and seen his vehicle drive for exactly . While starting an average of 12th place, Fred's vehicles have finished an average of 14th place.

References

NASCAR team owners
Place of birth missing (living people)
Year of birth missing (living people)
Living people